Solidago inornata, is a rare North American plant species in the family Asteraceae. It is native to the states of Minnesota and North Dakota in the north-central United States. It was first described in 1911 from specimens collected near Pleasant Lake in Benson County.

Solidago inornata is a small perennial herb up to 10 cm (4 inches) tall. Leaves are lance-shaped. Flower heads are each about 3 mm high. Leaves are lance-shaped, firm and rigid. The plant produces only a few flower heads compared to other species of goldenrod, the heads borne in branching arrays at the tops of the stems..''

References

inornata
Flora of North Dakota
Flora of Minnesota
Plants described in 1911
Flora without expected TNC conservation status